Portugal competed at the 2008 Summer Olympics in Beijing, People's Republic of China. It was the nation's twenty-second consecutive appearance at the Olympics.
The Olympic Committee of Portugal was represented by a delegation of 129 people, of which 77 were competitors participating in 16 sports.
Nelson Évora, the 2007 triple jump world champion, was chosen as the flag bearer during the opening ceremony; he won the triple jump event, giving Portugal its fourth ever Olympic gold medal.

Medalists

Archery

A single male archer secured qualification by winning the individual competition at the Final World Qualification Tournament, in Boé, France.

Athletics

As in previous editions, the Portuguese Olympic team's biggest share of competitors will compete in athletics events. Twenty-seven athletes (13 men and 14 women) will perform in a wide range of track and field disciplines, including the long-distance events, where Portugal holds its best record, but also the more technical events, where national athletes have achieved international-level results in the build-up to the Beijing Games.

Notable male athletes include the 2004 Olympic 100 metres silver medalist, Francis Obikwelu, and the 2007 triple jump world champion, Nelson Évora. Susana Feitor—bronze in the 20 km walk at the 2005 World Championships—and Naide Gomes—2008 world and 2007 European indoor long jump champion—are featured among the women's contingent.

Men
Track & road events

Field events

Women
Track & road events

Field events

Badminton

Marco Vasconcelos qualified for his third consecutive Olympic Games in virtue of a 64th place in the Badminton World Federation (BWF) men's ranking list, which allowed him to be the 32nd qualified player in a total of 41 individual players. For the first time, women's national badminton will be represented at the Olympics, thanks to the 59th place of Ana Moura in the BWF women's ranking, which converted her in the 31st qualified player from a total of 47 individual players.

Canoeing

Having reached the K-1 1000 metres final and the K-1 500 metres semifinal in his first Olympic appearance, in 2004, Emanuel Silva will be participating in the same two events, in Beijing.

Portugal will be represented in the women's kayak events for the first time, with Teresa Portela and the pair Beatriz Gomes and Helena Rodrigues in the 500 metres distance. All competitors were granted qualification by allocation of spare athlete quota places.

Sprint

Qualification Legend: QS = Qualify to semi-final; QF = Qualify directly to final

Cycling

A maximum of three places were allocated to Portugal in the men's road event, due to a tenth place in the 2006-2007 UCI Europe Tour nations ranking, which corresponded to a second place in terms of continental Olympic qualification. A quota place was available for the men's time trial event, but it was not taken.
The national cycling federation chose to send 2004 Olympic silver medalist Sérgio Paulinho together with André Cardoso and Nuno Ribeiro. However, just five days before the road race event, it was announced that Paulinho would not compete in Beijing due to asthma problems, and that he would not be replaced by another rider.

Road

Equestrian

Three horse riders qualified for the individual dressage competition—hence for the team competition, as well—, by benefiting from Switzerland's decision of not competing in the dressage events, but also from allocation of unused quota places. Daniel Pinto returns to the Olympic Games after his debut in Sydney 2000, while his brother Carlos Pinto will make his first Olympic appearance.

Dressage

Fencing

For the second time, since Rome 1960, Portugal qualified a female fencer for the individual foil competition. Débora Nogueira secured her place in Beijing by coming second in the European qualification tournament, held in Lisbon. She is joined by Joaquim Videira, a silver medalist in the men's individual épée at the 2006 World Fencing Championships, who qualified in virtue of his third place in the FIE individual adjusted official ranking (AOR).

Men

Women

Gymnastics

Portugal had qualified two places in trampoline gymnastics.

Trampoline

Judo

In the wake of Nuno Delgado's bronze medal in 2000 (the first Olympic judo medal), the national judo scene developed considerably and new stars emerged, achieving international results of credit. Among notable judokas competing in Beijing are 2008 under-81 kg European champion, João Neto, and two-time under-52 kg European champion and 2007 World Judo Championships runner-up, Telma Monteiro.

Men

Women

Rowing

A national crew achieved qualification for the men's lightweight double sculls event, by reaching second place in the Final Olympic Qualification Regatta, held in Poznań.

Men

Qualification Legend: FA=Final A (medal); FB=Final B (non-medal); FC=Final C (non-medal); FD=Final D (non-medal); FE=Final E (non-medal); FF=Final F (non-medal); SA/B=Semifinals A/B; SC/D=Semifinals C/D; SE/F=Semifinals E/F; QF=Quarterfinals; R=Repechage

Sailing

A sport with tradition and success in the nation's Olympic history (four medals), the sailing events will feature nine Portuguese sailormen distributed among five classes. Notable sailors include former sailboard world and three-time European champion (Mistral and Neil Pryde RS:X), João Rodrigues; 2003 ISAF Laser world champion, Gustavo Lima; and 2008 470 world championship runner-up and European champion crew, Álvaro Marinho and Miguel Nunes.

Men

Open

M = Medal race; EL = Eliminated – did not advance into the medal race; CAN = Race cancelled

Shooting

Two male shooters will take part in three events. João Costa returns to the Olympics to compete in the same two events where he debuted in 2000. Manuel Silva also makes an Olympic comeback, in the trap event, sixteen years later. Both qualified as 2006 World Cup winners.

Men

Swimming

Portuguese swimmers have achieved qualifying standards in the swimming events (up to a maximum of two swimmers per event with the Olympic Qualifying Time (OQT), and potentially one with the Olympic Selection Time (OST)). Additionally, Portugal had qualified one male and one female swimmer to the inaugural open-water marathon.

Men

Women

Table tennis

For the first time in Olympic history, Portugal had qualified in table tennis. A maximum of three players participated in the men's singles: João Monteiro, qualified via Continental Qualification Tournament, Marcos Freitas and Tiago Apolónia, qualified due to allocation of unused team quota places.

Taekwondo

Taekwondo was the second Olympic sport where Portuguese competitors entered for the first time, in Beijing. The feat was achieved by Pedro Póvoa, following his victory in the European Qualification Tournament, held in Istanbul.

Triathlon

The nation's second consecutive presence in the Olympic triathlon competition will be expanded to both events, with the qualification of two male triathletes. They will join Vanessa Fernandes, eight place in Athens, who is aiming to grab the Olympic gold medal, following a world title, in 2007, and a fifth consecutive European title, in 2008.

See also
 Portugal at the 2008 Summer Paralympics

Notes and references
Notes

References

 
 
sports-reference

Nations at the 2008 Summer Olympics
2008
Summer Olympics